Aleksejs Volosanovs (born 5 March 1975) is a retired Latvian footballer who played for numerous clubs in Latvia and England.

Club career

Volosanovs began his career in his native Latvia, playing for FK Rēzekne, Dinaburg FC, FK Zibens/Zemessardze and SK Dižvanagi. In the 2000s, Volosanovs moved to England and played for Ledbury Town, Worcester City, Stourport Swifts and finally Chipping Norton Town before retiring in 2007 after the club withdrew from the Hellenic League.

International career

On 8 February 1998, Volosanovs played 42 minutes against Malta in the Rothmans Tournament before being substituted for Imants Bleidelis.

References

1975 births
Living people
Latvian footballers
Expatriate footballers in England
Association football midfielders
Latvian expatriate footballers
Chipping Norton Town Swifts F.C. players
Stourport Swifts F.C. players
Worcester City F.C. players
Ledbury Town F.C. players
Dinaburg FC players
Latvia international footballers